Cunningham is a surname of Scottish origin. It may also refer to:

Places

Australia
 Division of Cunningham, an Australian Electoral Division in New South Wales
 Electoral district of Cunningham, a former State Electoral Division in Queensland
 Cunninghams Gap, a pass over the Great Dividing Range between the Darling Downs and Brisbane areas in Queensland
 Cunningham, Queensland, a locality in the Southern Downs Region on the Darling Downs
 Cunningham, South Australia, a locality on Yorke Peninsula in South Australia

Canada
 Cunningham Lake, British Columbia
 Cunningham Island, British Columbia
 Cunningham Creek, British Columbia

United States
 Cunningham, Georgia, an unincorporated community
 Cunningham Township, Champaign County, Illinois
 Cunningham, Kansas, a city
 Cunningham, Kentucky, an unincorporated community
 Cunningham, Chariton County, Missouri, an unincorporated community
 Cunningham, Pemiscot County, Missouri, an unincorporated community
 Cunningham, Ohio, an unincorporated community
 Cunningham, Montgomery County, Tennessee, an unincorporated community
 Cunningham, Obion County, Tennessee, an unincorporated community
 Cunningham, Texas, an unincorporated community
 Cunningham, Virginia, an unincorporated community
 Cunningham, Adams County, Washington, an unincorporated community
 Cunningham, West Virginia, an unincorporated community
 Lake Cunningham, California
 Cunningham Park, Queens, New York City, New York

Elsewhere
 Cunningham Glacier, Queen Maud Mountains, Antarctica
 Mount Cunningham, South Georgia Island
 Cunningham (Open Constituency, Fiji), a former electoral division
 Cunningham (crater), on Mercury
 1754 Cunningham, an asteroid

Transportation
 Cunningham Highway, from Ipswich to the Darling Downs in Queensland, Australia
 Cunningham Road, Bangalore, India
 Cunningham automobile, an American luxury car (1907-1937)
 Cunningham Steam Wagon, an American steam truck (1900-1901)

Businesses
 Cunningham Broadcasting Corporation, owner of broadcast television stations in the United States
 Cunningham Drug (Canada), a defunct pharmacy chain
 Cunningham Drug (U.S.), an unrelated defunct pharmacy chain
 Cunningham Piano Company, a manufacturer of pianos

Other uses
 Clan Cunningham, a Scottish clan
 Cunningham (sailing), a device to adjust the sail shape on yachts
 Cunningham baronets, six titles

See also
 Cunninghame, a district of Scotland
 Justice Cunningham (disambiguation)